1600 Broadway (also known as the Colorado State Bank Building) is a high-rise office building in the city of Denver, Colorado. The building was designed by architecture firm RNL Design, and its construction was completed in 1972. Upon its completion, 1600 Broadway stood as the seventh-tallest building in Denver. It is currently ranked as the 30th-tallest building in Denver. BOK Financial Corporation, formerly the Colorado State Bank, is located at the building. In January 2019, Nuveen Real Estate purchased the building for $111 million.

References

External links
 Colorado State Bank Building Official site

See also
 List of tallest buildings in Denver

Skyscraper office buildings in Denver
Office buildings completed in 1972
Bank company headquarters in the United States